Nicotiana longiflora, the longflower tobacco or long-flowered tobacco, is a species of tobacco native to South America that is sometimes cultivated for its tubular flowers that emit a very sweet odour at night.

This plant has been a significant source of disease resistance in flue-cured and burley tobacco. Some of the disease impacted by resistance from this species are: black shank, cyst nematode, root-knot nematode, and wildfire. The resistance form N. longiflora imparts near immunity to race 0 black shank, but no resistance to race 1. One of the varieties still in use today is 14 x L8, the second most popular burley tobacco variety in the U.S.

References

longiflora
Tobacco
Taxa named by Antonio José Cavanilles